This is a list of the most visited websites worldwide according to the first 50 websites listed in the "Top Websites Ranking" lists published monthly by Similarweb,  along with their change in ranking compared to the previous month.

List

References 

21st century-related lists
Lists of Internet-related superlatives
Websites
Lists of websites